Clifton Branch is a stream in southeastern Howell County in the U.S. state of Missouri. It is a tributary to Myatt Creek.

Clifton Branch has the name of Reverend John Clifton, an early settler.

See also
List of rivers of Missouri

References

Rivers of Howell County, Missouri
Rivers of Missouri